Djebel Bouramli is a mountain located in the governorate of Gafsa, in the south-west of Tunisia.

It is in the center of a natural reserve created in 1993 and covers an area of fifty hectares.

References

Environment of Tunisia
Bouramli